TIB Development Bank, formerly known as Tanzania Investment Bank (TIB), is a government-owned development bank in Tanzania. The bank is the first development finance institution established by the Government of Tanzania. The activities of TIB are supervised by the Bank of Tanzania, the central bank and national banking regulator. TIB is registered as a Registered Financial Institution.

History
The bank was established by Act of Parliament in 1970. At that time, the main objective of TIB was to provide "medium and long-term loans to investors in commercial agriculture, manufacturing, processing, construction, transport, tourism and mining sectors". However, due to economic hardships, including a war with Idi Amin of neighboring Uganda and foreign currency exchange fluctuations within the Tanzanian economy, the bank became unable to service its financial obligations. To mitigate financial losses, TIB resorted to making short-term loans and to function like a commercial bank. The period between 1980 until 2003 was particularly hard on the bank.

Development Financial Institution
Over time, the Tanzanian government, the sole shareholder in TIB, re-capitalized the bank, re-vamped its strategic development plans and re-structured its management. , TIB had a total asset base in excess of TSh 93 billion (US$62 million). The government intends to raise that figure to TSh 400 billion (US$265 million), in the next several years. The bank has a significant portion of its portfolio in the Tanzanian agricultural sector.

Tanzania Investment Bank Group
Following the restructuring of Tanzania Investment Bank, three distinct, but related institutions were formed. The three institutions, together form the Tanzania Investment Bank Group or TIB Group:

 TIB Development Bank Limited - A development finance institution (DFI)
 TIB Corporate Finance Limited - A short term financing institution, serving large corporate clients, both public and private, in support of the functions of the DFI.
 TIB Rasilimali Limited - A registered brokerage company, wholly owned by the Government of Tanzania, that purchases and sells corporate bonds on the Dar es Salaam Stock Exchange. Rasilimali also offers investment advice to the Tanzanian government in support of the DFI.

Branches
The bank maintains branches at the following locations:

 Dar es Salaam Branch - Building 3, Mlimani City Office Park, Sam Nujoma Road, Dar es Salaam
 Mwanza Branch - 3rd Floor, PPF Plaza Building, Mwanza
 Arusha Branch - Central Plaza Building, Sokoine Road, Arusha
 Mbeya Branch - 28 Jakaranda Street, Mbeya
 Dodoma Branch - Dodoma
 Zanzibar Branch - Zanzibar

See also

References

External links
 Website of Bank of Tanzania
 Website of TIB Development Bank

Banks of Tanzania
Companies of Tanzania
Banks established in 1970
Dar es Salaam
1970 establishments in Tanzania